Koyal may refer to:

Koyal, Haryana, a village in India
Koyal, Madhya Pradesh, a village in India
Koyal, Rajasthan, a village in India
Koyal (TV series), a 2022 Pakistani television series